The tenth Inter-Cities Fairs Cup was played over the 1967–68 season. The competition was won by Leeds United over two legs in the final against Ferencváros. It was the first English victory in the competition, despite sides from the country having finished as defeated finalists on four previous occasions. English clubs went on to win the cup on the final four occasions it was contested.

First round

|}

First leg

Second leg
Dinamo Zagreb won 5–2 on aggregate.

Bologna won 2–0 on aggregate.

Ferencváros won 5–3 on aggregate.

Bordeaux won 9–4 on aggregate.

Fiorentina won 5–0 on aggregate.

Leeds won 16–0 on aggregate.

Napoli won 5–1 on aggregate.

Second round

|}

First leg

Second leg

Sporting CP won 3–2 on aggregate.

Hibernian won 6–4 on aggregate.

Leeds won 3–2 on aggregate.

Bologna won 2–1 on aggregate.

Third round

|}

Dundee FC, Rangers FC, Athletic Bilbao and Bologna received byes to the Quarter-Finals.

First leg

Second leg

Leeds won 2–1 on aggregate.

Quarter-finals

|}

First leg

Second leg
 
Bologna won 2–0 on aggregate.

Leeds won 2–0 on aggregate.

Semi-finals 

|}

First leg

Second leg

Ferencváros won 5–4 on aggregate.

Leeds won 2–1 on aggregate.

Final 

|}

First leg

Second leg

Leeds won 1–0 on aggregate.

External links 
 Inter-Cities Fairs Cup results at Rec.Sport.Soccer Statistics Foundation

2
Inter-Cities Fairs Cup seasons